Iman Hakim Ibrahim (born 9 March 2002) is a Singaporean footballer currently playing as a midfielder for Singapore Premier League club Tampines Rovers FC. He was named in Goal Singapore's NxGn 2020 list as one of the country's most promising talents, having previously won the Dollah Kassim Award in 2019. The midfielder draws inspiration from former Barcelona stars Ronaldinho, Xavi and Andres Iniesta.

Career statistics

Club

Notes

International Statistics

U19 International caps

U16 International caps

Honours

Club

Albirex Niigata (S) 

 Singapore Premier League: 2020

References

2002 births
Living people
Singaporean footballers
Association football midfielders
Singapore Premier League players
Albirex Niigata Singapore FC players